Juice jacking is a theoretical type of compromise of devices like phones and tablets which use the same cable for charging and data transfer, typically a USB cable. The goal of the attack is to either install malware on the device, or to surreptitiously copy potentially sensitive data. To date there have been no credible reported cases of juice jacking outside of research efforts.

Published research 
The Wall of Sheep, an event at Defcon has set up and allowed public access to an informational juice jacking kiosk each year at DefCon since 2011. Their intent is to bring awareness of this attack to the general public. Each of the informational juice jacking kiosks set up at the Wall of Sheep village have included a hidden CPU which is used in some way to notify the user that they should not plug their devices in to public charging kiosks. The first informational juice jacking kiosk included a screen which would change from "Free charging station" to a warning message that the user "should not trust public charging stations with their devices". One of the researchers who designed the charging station for the Wall of Sheep has given public presentations which showcase more malicious acts which could be taken via the kiosk, such as data theft, device tracking and information on compromising existing charging kiosks.

Security researcher Kyle Osborn released an attack framework called P2P-ADB in 2012 which utilized USB On-The-Go to connect an attacker's phone to a target victim's device. This framework included examples and proof of concepts which would allow attackers to unlock locked phones, steal data from a phone including authentication keys granting the attacker access to the target device owner's Google account.

Security researcher graduates and students from the Georgia Institute of Technology (Georgia Tech) released a proof of concept malicious tool "Mactans" which utilized the USB charging port on Apple mobile devices at the 2013 Blackhat USA security briefings. They utilized inexpensive hardware components to construct a small sized malicious wall charger which could infect an iPhone with the then-current version of iOS with malicious software while it was being charged. The software could defeat any security measures built into iOS and mask itself in the same way Apple masks background processes in iOS.

Security researchers Karsten Nohl and Jakob Lell from SRLabs published their research on BadUSB during the 2014 Blackhat USA security briefings. Their presentation on this attack mentions that a cellphone or tablet device charging on an infected computer would be one of the simplest method of propagating the BadUSB vulnerability. They include example malicious firmware code that would infect Android devices with BadUSB.

Researchers at Aries Security and the Wall of Sheep later revisited the juice jacking concept in 2016. They set up a "Video Jacking" charging station which was able to record the mirrored screen from phones plugged into their malicious charging station. Affected devices at the time included Android devices supporting SlimPort or MHL protocols over USB, as well as the most recent iPhone using a lightning charge cable connector.

Researchers at Symantec disclosed their findings on an attack they dubbed "Trustjacking" during the 2018 RSA Conference. The researchers identified that when a user approves access for a computer on an iOS device over USB, that this trusted access level is also applied to the devices's iTunes API which is accessible over wifi. This would allow attackers access to an iOS device even after the user has unplugged the device from a malicious or infected USB based charge source.

A researcher who goes by _MG_ released a USB cable implant they dubbed the "O.MG Cable". The O.MG Cable has a micro-controller embedded within the cable itself, a visual inspection would likely not detect a difference between the O.MG cable and a normal charging cable. The O.MG Cable allows attackers or red team penetration testers to remotely issue commands to the cable over wifi, and have those commands run on the host computer with the O.MG cable plugged in to it.

Public warnings and popular culture 
Brian Krebs was the first to report on this attack and coin the term "juice jacking." After seeing the informational cell phone charging kiosk set up in the Wall of Sheep at DefCon 19 in August 2011, he wrote the first article on his security journalism site Krebs on Security. The Wall of Sheep researchers—including Brian Markus, Joseph Mlodzianowski, and Robert Rowley—designed the kiosk as an information tool to bring awareness to the potential attack vector, and they have discussed, but not released, tools publicly which perform malicious actions on the charging devices.

An episode of the hacking series Hak5 released in September 2012 showcased a number of attacks which can be conducted using an attack framework named P2P-ADB released by Kyle Osborn. The P2P-ADB attack framework discussed utilizes one phone to attack another phone over a USB On-the-Go connection.

In late 2012, a document was released by the NSA warning government employees who travel about the threat of juice jacking. The document reminded readers to only use their personal power charging cables during overseas travel, to not charge in public kiosks, and to not utilize other people's computers for charging.

The Android Hackers Handbook released in March 2014 has dedicated sections discussing both juice jacking and the ADB-P2P framework.

Juice jacking was the central focus on an episode of CSI: Cyber. Season 1: Episode 9, "L0M1S" aired in April 2015

In November 2019, the Los Angeles Deputy District Attorney issued a public service announcement warning about the risks of juice jacking during the upcoming holiday travel season. This PSA came under scrutiny due to the fact that no public cases have come to light related to malicious charging kiosks found in public or any criminal cases being tried under the Los Angeles District Attorney's purview at the time of the PSA.

Mitigation 

Apple's iOS has taken multiple security measures to reduce the attack surface over USB including no longer allowing the device to automatically mount as a hard drive when plugged in over USB, as well as release security patches for vulnerabilities such as those exploited by Mactans.

Android devices commonly prompt the user before allowing the device to be mounted as a hard drive when plugged in over USB. Since release 4.2.2, Android has implemented a whitelist verification step to prevent attackers from accessing the Android Debug Bridge without authorization.

Juice jacking is not possible if a device is charged via a trusted AC adapter, battery backup device, or by utilizing a USB cable with only power wires and no data wires present. Similarly, a USB data blocker (sometimes referred to as a USB Condom) can be connected between a device and charging port to disallow a data connection.

References

Mobile security